Hugh Bonner (1840 in Ireland – March 13, 1908) was the sixth New York City Fire Commissioner.

In 1904, after having served as fire chief of the New York City Fire Department, Bonner moved to the Philippines (at that time an American territory), where he was the fire chief of Manila. Upon returning to the United States, he was appointed the 6th Fire Commissioner of the City of New York by Mayor George B. McClellan Jr. on February 10, 1908, and served in that position until his death a month later, on March 13, 1908.

References

External links
 

Commissioners of the New York City Fire Department
1840 births
1908 deaths
Irish emigrants to the United States (before 1923)